Tayeb Maroci (born June 1, 1985 in Maghnia, Algeria) is an Algerian footballer. He currently plays as a midfielder for NC Magra in the Algerian Ligue Professionnelle 1.

He has been capped at the Under-23 level and by the Algeria A' National Team in a friendly against USM Blida.

References

1985 births
Algerian footballers
Living people
JS Kabylie players
USM Blida players
People from Maghnia
Algerian Ligue Professionnelle 1 players
Algeria A' international footballers
JSM Béjaïa players
Algeria under-23 international footballers
IRB Maghnia players
Association football midfielders
21st-century Algerian people